Teichus or Teichos, also known as Teichus/Teichos of the Dymaeans, was a fortified settlement in the territory of Dyme, in ancient Achaea, near the promontory Araxus, which was said to have been built by Heracles, when he made war upon the Eleans. It was only a stadium and a half in circumference, but its walls were 30 cubits high. It was taken by the Eleans under Euripides in the Social War in 220 BCE, but it was recovered by Philip V of Macedon and restored to the Dymaeans in the following year.

Its site is located near the modern Araxos.

See also
Dymaean Wall

References

Populated places in ancient Achaea
Former populated places in Greece
Ancient Greek archaeological sites in Greece